Avis DeVoto (May 22, 1904 – March 7, 1989) was an American culinary editor, book reviewer, and cook. She was highly influential in editing and guiding two famous cookbooks to publication: Julia Child's Mastering the Art of French Cooking and the US edition of the British food writer Elizabeth David's Italian Food.

Biography
Avis MacVicar DeVoto was born in Houghton, Michigan, on May 22, 1904. She attended Northwestern University and at the end of her freshman year in 1923, she married American historian Bernard DeVoto, who had been her English instructor. The DeVotos remained in Evanston for four years and then moved to Cambridge, Massachusetts, where Bernard taught English at Harvard University until 1936. During these early years, DeVoto became acquainted with many literary icons - close friends of Bernard's - including Robert Frost and publishing executive Lovell Thompson. The DeVotos lived in Cambridge for the majority of their lives together. They had two sons, Gordon (d. 2009), an amateur writer, and Mark, a music theorist and composer who taught at Tufts University.

In addition to being an accomplished cook and book reviewer, Avis DeVoto worked for many years as Bernard's secretary, handling his correspondence and editing his writing. In 1952, DeVoto received a letter from Julia Child, at that time living in Paris, responding to one of Bernard's recent magazine columns on kitchen knives. DeVoto's reply to the letter initiated the correspondence and lifelong friendship between the two women. DeVoto and Child would not meet in person until 1954, but during those first two years they exchanged around 120 letters, which were eventually compiled into a book, As Always, Julia (2010).

DeVoto served as an early reader and editor for Child's forthcoming cookbook, Mastering the Art of French Cooking, and her editorial connections would help Child and her co-authors Louise Bertholle and Simone Beck sign a contract with Houghton Mifflin in 1954. When the publishing company rejected the book, DeVoto helped push for the book's publication by Alfred A. Knopf.

After Bernard DeVoto's sudden death in 1955, Avis DeVoto worked as a cookbook scout and editor for Knopf from 1956–1958. She later became House Secretary for Lowell House at Harvard from 1958 to 1963 and worked in the Deans’ Office at Radcliffe College until her retirement in 1969. During this time she also continued to edit and read manuscripts for Houghton Mifflin.

Death
DeVoto died of pancreatic cancer in 1989.

Portrayals
Actress Deborah Rush played DeVoto in the film Julie & Julia with Meryl Streep and Amy Adams.
Bebe Neuwirth plays her in the 2022 HBO Max series Julia with Sarah Lancashire.

References

Further reading
Reardon, Joan, ed. (2010) As Always, Julia: the letters of Julia Child and Avis DeVoto: food, friendship and the making of a masterpiece. Boston: Houghton Mifflin Harcourt.
James, Michael. (1992) Slow Food: Flavors and Memories of America's Hometowns. Warner Books.

External links
 Papers of Avis DeVoto, 1952-1968. Schlesinger Library, Radcliffe Institute, Harvard University.
Elizabeth David and Avis DeVoto Papers

1904 births
1989 deaths
American book editors
Deaths from pancreatic cancer
Writers from Cambridge, Massachusetts
20th-century American writers
20th-century American women writers
American women editors
People from Houghton, Michigan
Writers from Michigan
Northwestern University alumni
Radcliffe College people